IFES is the International Foundation for Electoral Systems.

IFES may also refer to:
 , a university in Guatemala
 Integer Factorization Encryption Scheme, an encryption scheme described by IEEE P1363
 International Fellowship of Evangelical Students, an international Christian organization